Margaret Prescott (or Preston) Montague (29 November 1878 – 26 September 1955) was an American short story writer, and novelist. Her middle name is sometimes attributed as Preston before changing to Prescott.

Her work appeared in Harper's among other places.

Her novels were adapted into the films Linda (1929), Calvert's Valley (1922), Uncle Sam of Freedom Ridge (1920) and Seeds of Vengeance (1920) from The Sowing of Alderson Cree.

Awards
 1919 O. Henry Award

Works

 


Stories

References

Further reading

External links
 
 
 
 
 

1878 births
1955 deaths
20th-century American novelists
20th-century American short story writers
20th-century American women writers
20th-century Christian mystics
American women novelists
American women short story writers
Appalachian writers
Novelists from West Virginia
O. Henry Award winners
Protestant mystics
People from White Sulphur Springs, West Virginia